Daud Khel is a town of Mianwali District in the Punjab province of Pakistan. The town is located at 32°52'60N 71°34'0E at an altitude of 207 metres, and is part of Mianwali Tehsil. It is administratively subdivided into two Union councils, one for the urban area and another for the rural area.

References

Populated places in Mianwali District